The 1956 Los Angeles State Diablos football team represented Los Angeles State College—now known as California State University, Los Angeles—as a member of the California Collegiate Athletic Association (CCAA) during the 1956 NCAA College Division football season. Led by sixth-year head coach Leonard Adams, Los Angeles State compiled an overall record of 3–5–1 with a mark of 0–1 in conference play, placing fourth in the CCAA. The Diablos played six home games at three separate sites: three games at Snyder Stadium in Los Angeles, two games East Los Angeles College Stadium in Monterey Park, California, and one game at Reseda High School in Reseda, Los Angeles.

Schedule

References

Los Angeles State
Cal State Los Angeles Diablos football seasons
Los Angeles State Diablos football